Janík is a village and municipality in Košice-okolie District in the Kosice Region of eastern Slovakia.

History
The village is first mentioned in historical records in 1285.

Geography
The village lies at an altitude of 203 meters and covers an area of 19.868 km². It has a population of about 580 people.

Genealogical resources

The records for genealogical research are available at the state archive "Statny Archiv in Kosice, Slovakia"

 Roman Catholic church records (births/marriages/deaths): 1827-1907 (parish A)
 Reformated church records (births/marriages/deaths): 1737-1899 (parish B)

See also
 List of municipalities and towns in Slovakia

External links
Statistical Office of the Slovak republic
Surnames of living people in Janik

Villages and municipalities in Košice-okolie District